Mariano Damián Puch (born 13 August 1990) is an Argentine professional footballer who plays as a midfielder for Flandria.

Career
Puch started his career with Flandria of Primera B Metropolitana, he made two appearances before joining Primera D Metropolitana club Fénix and going on to score eleven goals in eight-three appearances as the club won back-to-back promotions. Spells with Atlanta, Nueva Chicago and Gimnasia y Esgrima followed before Puch joined Argentine Primera División team Atlético de Rafaela. However, after just one appearance, Puch departed the club in 2017 to join Primera B Nacional side Los Andes. After one goal in eight games during 2016–17, Puch left to rejoin Flandria ahead of the 2017–18 Primera B Nacional.

His Flandria debut came versus Juventud Unida on 17 September. Puch scored his first Flandria goal in his twelfth appearance, on 17 February 2018 against Sarmiento. June 2018 saw Puch complete a move to Almagro. Twelve months later, the midfielder joined Comunicaciones. He made a total of thirty-three appearances for those two clubs. In August 2020, Puch headed to Flandria; for a third spell with them.

Career statistics
.

Honours
Fénix
 Primera D Metropolitana: 2011–12

References

External links
 

1990 births
Living people
People from Moreno Partido
Argentine footballers
Association football midfielders
Primera B Metropolitana players
Argentine Primera División players
Primera Nacional players
Flandria footballers
Club Atlético Fénix players
Club Atlético Atlanta footballers
Nueva Chicago footballers
Gimnasia y Esgrima de Mendoza footballers
Atlético de Rafaela footballers
Club Atlético Los Andes footballers
Club Almagro players
Club Comunicaciones footballers
Sportspeople from Buenos Aires Province